Greg Donaghey is an Australian former professional rugby league footballer who played in the 1990s. He played for Manly-Warringah and Balmain in NSWRL, ARL and NRL competitions.

Playing career
Donaghey made his first grade debut for Manly in round 21 of the 1994 NSWRL season against South Sydney. In Donaghey's second game in the top grade, he played off the bench in Manly's minor preliminary semi-final loss against Brisbane. After being out of first grade for two years, Donaghey signed a contract to join Balmain ahead of the 1997 ARL season. Donaghey made 32 appearances over two seasons with the club.

References

1974 births
Manly Warringah Sea Eagles players
Balmain Tigers players
Australian rugby league players
Rugby league centres
Rugby league wingers
Living people